Neurostrota pithecolobiella is a moth of the family Gracillariidae. It is known from Cuba.

The larvae feed on Samanea saman. They mine the stem of their host plant.

References

Gracillariinae
Moths described in 1934
Endemic fauna of Cuba